Comlongon Castle is a tower house dating from the later 15th century or early 16th century. The original tower has been extended by the addition of a  baronial style mansion, completed around 1900. Originally built by the Murrays of Cockpool, it remained in the Murray family until 1984. It was subsequently restored, having been vacant for some time, and the castle and mansion are now a hotel. As of 15 April 2019, the business side of Comlongon Castle has gone into Administration, consequently all weddings due and accommodation booked for after this date were cancelled, leaving the future of the castle uncertain.

History
Thomas Randolph, 1st Earl of Moray, granted the lands of Comlongon, in the early 14th century, to his nephew William de Moravia, ancestor of the Murrays of Cockpool. Comlongon was built to replace the Murrays' earlier castle of Cockpool, of which only earthworks remain at Cockpool Farm, to the south west of Comlongon. The construction of Comlongon has been attributed to Cuthbert of Cockpool (died 1493) in the later part of the 15th century. However a licence to build was granted to his son John Murray (died c.1527) in around 1500, leading Alastair Maxwell-Irving to suggest it was built in the first decade of the 16th century. It was certainly present in 1508, when it is mentioned in documents creating the Barony of Cockpool for John Murray. Descendants of the Murrays were later created Viscounts Stormont in 1621, and Earls of Mansfield in 1776, and Comlongon was part of the Earl's estate until 1984.

An adjacent mansion was built in the 18th century, and was replaced with the present Baronial style house in 1900, designed by local architects John M. Bowie and James Barbour. From 1939 until 1952 the house served as a children's home operated by Barnardo's. After a spell of occasional use it was sold by the Earl to Tony Ptolomey, who set about refurbishing both tower house and mansion as a hotel.

The hotel, operated by a partnership, was a popular wedding venue until April 2019, when the business entered administration after being assessed a payment of almost £40,000 the previous year to a former employee who was ruled to have been unfairly dismissed.

The castle

The red sandstone tower is described as "exceptionally complete". It was built on a stone 'plinth' in order to support the structure on what was a marshy site. The entrance to the tower still retains the original yett, an iron lattice gate, in front of the door. The main stair at the north-east corner leads up to a cap-house at parapet level, while the second serves the high-table end of the first floor hall.

The hall is dominated by a large fireplace, with the Royal Arms of Scotland carved above it. Next to the fireplace is an elaborately decorated aumbry (a ceremonial recess), with a carved cinquefoil surround that attests to the relative wealth of the Murrays. A separate fireplace at the opposite end of the hall would have served the narrow kitchen, and would have been separated from the hall by a timber screen where a wall now stands. Heraldic emblems are carved onto several projecting corbels. Similarities in the design and layout of Comlongon's hall with that of Elphinstone Tower in Lothian, have led to suggestions that two further storeys lie above the hall, with parapet walks at roof level. The western parapet was roofed over before 1624, when a surviving inventory was taken, creating a gallery with crow-stepped gables. A similar structure was built over the south-east corner, giving the south facade a symmetrical appearance. The upper storeys were also subdivided before this time.

The thick walls are riddled with 12 mural chambers including bed recesses as well as a guardroom, with a cell beyond, and a trapdoor which gives access to a grim unlit dungeon below. The presence of these rooms within the walls reduces the overall strength of the tower, which has had to be reinforced to support the weight of its roof.

A walled courtyard and ditch, possibly a moat, once surrounded the tower, although this was removed in the early 18th century when the mansion house was added to the east side of the tower. The Scottish Baronial mansion reflects the style of the earlier tower, with many crowsteps and corbels, and incorporates 18th-century interior features. Comlongon Castle and the tower house are category A listed buildings.

References

Further reading
Coventry, Martin The Castles of Scotland (3rd Edition), Goblinshead, 2001
Gifford, John The Buildings of Scotland: Dumfries and Galloway, Penguin, 1996
Lindsay, Maurice The Castles of Scotland, Constable & Co. 1986
Salter, Mike The Castles of South West Scotland, Folly Publications, 1993
Steell, Geoffrey Dumfries and Galloway (2nd Edition), Stationery Office, 1996

External links

Castles in Dumfries and Galloway
Category A listed buildings in Dumfries and Galloway
Listed castles in Scotland
Reportedly haunted locations in Scotland